Gabu is the largest town in eastern Guinea-Bissau and capital of the Gabu Region.

History
From 1537, the town was the centre of the eponymous kingdom of Kaabu, also written Ngabou or N’Gabu. Its population was originally a Mandé people from what is currently Mali, and the kingdom was initially vassal to the Mali Empire. As the latter waned, Sama Koli, Gabu's governor, proclaimed himself king, but maintained many of the trappings of Malian cultural heritage. The kingdom built earthen ramparts around the settlement (now vanished) and established trade relations with the Portuguese on the coast.

In the early nineteenth century, the Fula ethnic group converted to Islam and began the Kansala War to end Mandé dominance. It ended with a big fire which caused extensive damage and casualties on both sides. Gabu there after became linked with the 
Imamate of Futa Jallon and was finally assimilated into the Portuguese Empire. The Portuguese named the town "Nova Lamego" ie "New Lamego", after the Douro town of Lamego. It was renamed Gabu (sometimes spelled Cabu) after Guinea Bissau's independence.

Trade
Gabu is now mostly known as a market town with the second largest market of Guinea-Bissau, notably trading coal and ceramics as well as agricultural products. Traders come from as far afield as Guinea and Senegal.

Climate
Gabú has a tropical savanna climate (Köppen Aw), similar to that of the capital Bissau but with – due to its inland location – about a quarter less rainfall and larger diurnal temperature variations. As with all of Guinea-Bissau, there are two extremely contrasting seasons: a dry season from November to May with dusty harmattan winds and hot to sweltering, rainless weather, and a monsoonal wet season from June to October featuring heavy thunderstorm rains almost every day and hot, uncomfortably humid conditions.

References

Gabu Region
Populated places in Guinea-Bissau
Sectors of Guinea-Bissau